At  above sea level the Ebersnacken is the highest hill in the forested uplands of the Vogler in Lower Saxony, Germany. 

The hill is situated in the district of Holzminden about half way as the crow flies between Bodenwerder to the northwest and Stadtoldendorf to the southeast.

On the summit, which is surrounded by the northern part of the Solling-Vogler Nature Park, stands an observation tower, the Ebersnacken Tower (Ebersnackenturm), from which there is not only a good all-round view of the surrounding Weser Uplands, but also a view eastwards as far as the Harz mountains. At the foot of the tower is a barbecue hut. 

No roads lead to the Ebersnacken; it can only be reached on footpaths, for example from the Holenberg to the southeast.

Hills of Lower Saxony
Holzminden (district)